Sergey Betov and Mikhail Elgin were the defending champions but only Betov returned, partnering Tomasz Bednarek. Betov lost in the quarterfinals to Mateusz Kowalczyk and Antonio Šančić.

James Cerretani and Philipp Oswald won the title after defeating Mateusz Kowalczyk and Antonio Šančić 4–6, 7–6(7–5), [10–2] in the final.

Seeds

Draw

References
 Main Draw

Sparkassen Open - Doubles